Corophiida is an infraorder of amphipods that contains the two parvorders Caprellidira (skeleton shrimp and whale lice) and Corophiidira.

In 2003-2013 this group was treated as a suborder, Corophiidea, which in turn had been re-established to contain the taxa previously treated as the suborder Caprellidea, together with some families formerly placed in the suborder Gammaridea. More recently, the group was made part of the new suborder Senticaudata.

References

External links

 
Amphipoda
Arthropod infraorders